The Western Australia Post Office Directory, also known as Wise Directories or Wise Street Directories, was published in Perth in 1893–1949.

It was published by H. Pierssené and later by H. Wise & Co.  It listed household, business, society, and Government contacts in Perth, Fremantle, Kalgoorlie, Boulder and Coolgardie including some rural areas of Western Australia.

Publishers
The Western Australian Directory was published by H. Pierssene between 1893-1895. Herbert Pierssene was a merchant and importer of English continental and Ceylonese goods. He was an agent for McCulluch Carrying Company and a bottler of West Australian wines.

The Western Australia Post Office Directory was published by Wise & Co. between 1895 and 1949 with the exception of 1943 and 1948.

Wise Directories
The directories provide information by locality, individual surname, government service, and by trade or profession. The addresses of householders and businesses throughout Western Australia are included.  Maps were sometimes published with an edition of the directory.  The towns section of the directories normally contained separate street directories of Perth and suburbs, Fremantle and suburbs, Kalgoorlie, Boulder and Coolgardie.

Known colloquially to users and  book collectors as Wise Directories or Wise Street Directories the red covered directories were published between 1893 and 1949.  Due to the annual changes, the directories are valuable historical documents for Western Australian history.  They are scarce in the Australian rare book market.

The directories have been invaluable referent points for such projects as the Dictionary of Western Australians and others where the street lists in the directory provide details of inhabitants and houses in some streets in the more built-up residential areas.  Country towns in the directory have name lists only.

They have been available in microfilm form in J S Battye Library, and more recently have become online in one of the J S Battye Library digitization projects.

See also
 Australia Post
Australian Dictionary of Biography
Cyclopedia of Western Australia
Dictionary of Australian Biography
State Records Office of Western Australia

References

External links
 http://www.slwa.wa.gov.au/find/wa_resources/post_office_directories

Books about Western Australia
Western Australia Post Office Directory
Australian directories
Gazetteers
Postal system of Australia